Events from the year 1990 in Croatia.

Incumbents
President – Franjo Tuđman
Prime Minister – Josip Manolić

Events
January 1 -– A new convertible Yugoslav dinar is introduced to combat inflation, at an exchange rate of 10,000 old dinars for 1 new convertible dinar.
February 14 – The Parliament of the Socialist Republic of Croatia (SR Croatia) adopts constitutional amendments 54 to 63, paving the way for free and democratic elections.
April 22–May 7 – First democratic election.
May 5 – 1990 Eurovision Song Contest hosted in Zagreb's Vatroslav Lisinski Concert Hall.
May 13 – Dinamo Zagreb-Red Star Belgrade riot occurred at Stadion Maksimir in Zagreb.
July 26 – Croatian national news service HINA founded.
August 1 – SAO Krajina proclaimed autonomy.
August 17 – Log Revolution.
September 7 – Lučko Anti-Terrorist Unit founded.
October 10 – National postal service Hrvatska pošta (Croatian Post) established.
December 21 – The flag of Croatia, designed by Miroslav Šutej, adopted.
December 22 – The new Constitution of Croatia adopted.

Arts and literature
Brethren of the Croatian Dragon reestablished after being banned by the Communist government in 1946.

Sport
Croatia played the United States on October 28 in the country's first international football match.
Jugoplastika Split became Euroleague champion.
Croatia Open Umag tennis tournament was held for the first time.
European Championships in Athletics was held in Split.

Births
June 21 – Sandra Perković, discus thrower
June 30 – Sandro Sukno, water polo player
August 17 – Ivan Šarić, chess player
November 14 – Tereza Mrdeža, Croatian tennis player

Deaths
February 4 – Toma Bebić, singer-songwriter (born 1935)
February 24 – Jure Kaštelan, poet (born 1919)
October 4 – Matija Skurjeni, painter (born 1898)

References

 
Years of the 20th century in Croatia
Croatia